Dmitri Anatolevich Fomin (Russian: Дмитрий "Митя" Анатольевич Фомин; born 17 January 1974), known by his stage name Mitya Fomin, is a Russian solo singer, dancer and producer. Between 1998 and 2009, he was a member of the dance group Hi-Fi.

Early life
He was born to Anatoly Fomin (1939-2014), an associate professor at the Institute of Communications and Tamara Fomina (1942), an engineer. 

From January 2018 to 2021, Fomin was banned for 3 years from entering Ukraine because of his (during a concert in Lviv) claim that since the 2014 Russian annexation of Crimea, Crimea is a "Russian territory." In April or May 2022, Fomin participated in a concert organized in order to support the 2022 Russian invasion of Ukraine.

With Hi-Fi

Later on, Mitya Fomin moved to Moscow where his friends producer Erica Chanturia and composer Pavla Esenina offered him to join Hi-Fi in 1998 with Oksana Oleshko and later on Tatyana Tereshina.

While in the group, Mitya started working with many writers and composers for his own work and decided to leave the group in January 2009 after more than 10 years with the band.

Solo
In March 2009, he collaborated with songwriter and producer Maxim Fadeev in releasing his debut solo single "Две земли". 

He released at the end of 2010 his debut solo album Так будет (meaning So it will be) that included his hits and other rhythmic, relax, ambient and easy dance songs. He also released single "Перезимуем" again featuring StuFF with a video directed by Mitya himself. He also collaborated with the Pet Shop Boys in his dance hit single "Огни большого города (Paninaro)" (Ogni Bolshogo Goroda meaning City Lights) and finally "Не манекен" with Christina Orsoy (Кристиной Орсой) filmed in Hong Kong.

Others
Besides directing many of his music videos, Mitya Fomin is also directing videos for other artists, for example Yena's "Эксбой" (Exboy). He is also involved in 2011 series of Russian reality television show Жена напрокат.

Awards / Nominations
(For awards with Hi-Fi, see Hi-Fi)

Discography

Albums
As Hi-Fi (studio albums)
1999: Первый контакт
1999: Репродукция
2001: Запоминай
2002: Новая коллекция 2002 (DJ remixes)
As Hi-Fi (collection albums)
1999: Звёздная серия
2002: Best
2005: Любовное настроение
2008: Best 1
Solo

Singles
As Hi-Fi

Solo

References

External links
Mitya Fomin Official website

1974 births
Living people
20th-century Russian singers
21st-century Russian singers
Russian record producers
20th-century Russian male singers
21st-century Russian male singers
Winners of the Golden Gramophone Award